Wrights Creek may refer to:
 Wrights Creek, New South Wales, a locality in the City of Hawkesbury, Sydney, New South Wales, Australia
 Wrights Creek, Queensland, a locality in the Cairns Region, Queensland, Australia

See also 
 Wright Creek (disambiguation)